Sheilah Gashumba  is a Ugandan media personality and TV host.   She hosts  NBS After5 an entertainment show  on  NBS Television.

Early life and education 
Gashumba attended Taibah International School, Galaxy International School Kampala, Kabojja International School, City Varsity Media & Creative Arts in Cape Town, South Africa.

Career 
Gashumba started presenting a teen`s club  show on WBS TV in 2007.  Sheila later joined NTV  where she presented T-Nation and later NTV The Beat with Douglas Lwanga.
In November 2021,  she joined NBS Television where she currently hosts   NBS After5, an entertainment   show which airs from Monday to Friday from 5:00pm up to 7:00pm with MC Kats, Douglas Lwanga, DJ Mercy Pro and DJ Roja from the duo Slick Stuart & Dj Roja.</ref>. Sheila also opened up her own fashio house called Gash Luxe located in the heart of Kampala. Sheila Gashumba also early this year left NBS television and she is nolonger an employee with the media house.

Honors

References

External links
Sheila Gashumba to Host New South African TV Show
 Sheila Gashumba Joins NBS TV - SoftPower News
 Huge Upgrade: Sheilah Gashumba's new salary at NBS TV leaked
 Here is Sheilah Gashumba, Douglas Lwanga and MC Kats’ monthly salary at NBS TV
Sheilah Gashumba Makes Comeback With NBS After5

Year of birth missing (living people)
Place of birth missing (living people)
Living people
Ugandan women journalists
Ugandan journalists
Ugandan television journalists
Ugandan television presenters
Ugandan women television presenters
Ugandan women television journalists
People from Kampala District
People from Central Region, Uganda